Coda or CODA may refer to:

Arts, entertainment, and media

Films
 Movie coda, a post-credits scene
 Coda (1987 film), an Australian horror film about a serial killer, made for television
Coda, a 2017 American experimental film from Nathaniel Dorsky's Arboretum Cycle
 Coda (2019 film), a Canadian drama film starring Patrick Stewart, Katie Holmes, and Giancarlo Esposito
 CODA (2021 film), an American drama film featuring a child of deaf adults

Music
 Coda (music), a passage which brings a movement or piece to a conclusion through prolongation
 Coda (Led Zeppelin album), 1982
 Coda (SMP album), 2010
 Coda, a 1983 album by Ryuichi Sakamoto
 Coda (Australian band), world music band
 Coda (Mexican band), a rock band from Mexico
 "Coda", a song by God Is an Astronaut from the album The End of the Beginning

Television
"Coda" (Star Trek: Voyager), a 1997 episode of Star Trek: Voyager
"Coda" (The Walking Dead), a 2014 episode of The Walking Dead
"Coda", a 2016 episode of Endeavour season 3
"Coda", a 2011 episode of Criminal Minds season 6

Other uses in arts, entertainment, and media
 Coda (ballet), the final dance in a grand pas
 Coda (comics), a group of female warriors in Wildstorm comics
 Coda (magazine), a Canadian jazz magazine published from 1958 to 2009
 Coda (novel), a 1994 novel by Thea Astley
 Coda Media, a news website
 CODA System, a role-playing game system

Computing and technology
 Coda (file system), a network file system
 Coda (web development software), a web development application
 CODA Content Delivery Architecture
 Coda.io, a cloud-based document editor
 CEBAF On-line Data Acquisition, a system used at Jefferson Lab in the United States
 Component detection algorithm, an algorithm in mass spectrometry

Organizations and enterprises
 CODA (company), financial software specialist now owned by UNIT4
 Calgary Olympic Development Association, the former name of the Canadian Winter Sport Institute, a non-profit organization
 Co-Dependents Anonymous (CoDA), a twelve-step program
 Coda Automotive, an electric motor vehicle company headquartered in Southern California, US
 Coda (electric car), an all-electric car manufactured by Coda Automotive
 Coordinadora de Organizaciones de Defensa Ambiental, a coalition of Spanish environmental groups
 Content Overseas Distribution Association, a trade association for international distribution of Japanese content

Other uses
 Syllabic coda, (linguistics) the final consonant(s) of a syllable
 Child of deaf adult (or CODA), a hearing person who was raised by a deaf parent or guardian
 CODA (mixed-use development), Midtown Atlanta, US
 Coda (surname)
 Coda alla vaccinara, an Italian stew using oxtail

See also

 Caudate sonnet, an expanded version of the sonnet
 Koda (disambiguation)
 Cauda (disambiguation)